Devender Yadav is an Indian politician belonging to the Indian National Congress (INC). He is currently All India Congress Screening Committee Member and INC Incharge of Uttarakhand. He was a member of the legislative assembly from Badli constituency in Delhi from 2008-2013 and 2013-15 and was defeated by Ajesh Yadav of AAP in the Delhi Elections 2015.

Political career
He is a member of INC Screening Committee and INC Incharge of Uttarakhand and ex-MLA of the Badli constituency. He was elected for the Fourth and Fifth Legislative Assembly of Delhi in 2009 and 2013 but lost in 2015 to Ajesh Yadav (AAP) by a margin of 35,376 votes.

References

External links 
 
 Facebook

Delhi MLAs 2008–2013
Living people
Indian National Congress politicians
Delhi MLAs 2013–2015
1972 births